The sand dragonet (Callionymus marleyi) is a species of dragonet native to the western Indian Ocean where it occurs at depths of from  over sandy substrates.  Its diet consists mostly of benthic invertebrates.  This species grows to a length of  TL. The specific name most likely honours Harold Walter Bell-Marley (1873-1945) soldier and the Principal Fisheries Officer in the Natal Province from 1918 to 1937.

References 

M
Taxa named by Charles Tate Regan
Fish described in 1919